Franklin Township is a township in York County, Pennsylvania, United States. The population was 5,029 at the 2020 census.

History
Clear Spring Mill was listed on the National Register of Historic Places in 1996.

Geography
The township occupies the westernmost corner of York County in south-central Pennsylvania, and it surrounds the borough of Franklintown, located near the eastern corner of the township.

Demographics
As of the census of 2020, there were 5,032 people, 1,920 households, and 1,284 families living in the township.  The population density was 262.1 people per square mile (101.2/km2).  There were unknown number of housing units.  The racial makeup of the township was 93.3% White, 2.1% African American, 0.0% Native American, 0.9% Asian, 0.00% Pacific Islander, 1.8% Hispanics or Latino, and 3.7% from two or more races. 

There were 1,920 households.  The average household size was 2.62.

In the township the population was spread out, with 22.7% under the age of 18, 62.5% between the ages of 18 and 65, and 14.8% who were 65 years of age or older. 48.0% of the population consists of females and 52.0 percent of the population consists of males.

The median income for a household in the township was $70.507. The income per capita was $38,728. 7.5% of the population were in poverty.

From 2015 to 2019, there were 367 veterans.

From 2015 to 2019, 90.9% percent of the households had a computer, while 80.7% of the households had a broadband internet subscription. 97.1% of the population age 25 or higher has a high school graduate degree or higher, while 24.4% of the population age 25 or higher has a bachelor's degree or higher.

Notable residents
Francis Charles Portzline, fraktur artist

References

Populated places established in 1740
Townships in York County, Pennsylvania
Townships in Pennsylvania